Dragonflies is a 2022 Spanish drama film directed by Luc Knowles in his feature film debut which stars Milena Smit and Olivia Baglivi.

Plot 
The plot follows the story of two friends, Cata and Alex, who develop escapist plans about fleeing from their homes in an undeterminate location in the outskirts of Madrid, a seemingly idyllic but actually decaying place.

Cast

Production 
The film is a Clapham Films production. It was shot in locations of the province of Segovia and the Madrid region. Iván Sánchez worked as cinematographer.

Release 
Distributed by Begin Again Films, it was theatrically released in Spain on 16 September 2022.

Reception 
Beatriz Martínez of Fotogramas rated the film 4 out of 5 stars highlighting the chemistry between Smit and Baglivi as the best thing about the film.

Manuel J. Lombardo of Diario de Sevilla rated the film 2 out of 5 stars, assessing that Knowles' debut feature "smells too much like a photocopy of numerous [common] places in American indie cinema", otherwise incorporating themes of lumpen sorority and escapist desires, a forced criminal-police subplot and a flamenco-electro soundtrack that underpin a "new and artificial" product.

 of Cinemanía rated it 3 out 5 stars observing that "were it not for the interpretative tête-à-tête of its actresses, [Knowles'] proposal would not advance much further than the author's previous musical video for the song 'Wondering'".

Josu Eguren of El Correo rated the film 1 out of 3 stars, considering that below "the laconic and nihilistic surface of the dialogues" held by the protagonists, the film is based on "such a fragile aesthetic pose" that it threatens to fall apart upon Knowles' attempt to introduce some drops of thriller in the mix.

Luis Martínez of El Mundo rated Dragonflies 3 out of 5 stars, deeming it to be "an incomplete, uneven and slightly pretentious film", yet also "perfectly alive", otherwise highlighting the helmer's ability "to create a strange and slightly impostured universe, as much his own as delicate".

Accolades 

|-
| align = "center" rowspan = "2" | 2022 || rowspan = "3" | 25th Málaga Film Festival || Best Actress ('Zonazine' section) || Milena Smit & Olivia Baglivi ||  || rowspan = "2" | 
|-
| colspan = "2" | Audience Award ('Zonazine' section) || 
|}

See also 
 List of Spanish films of 2022

References

External links
 

2022 drama films
Spanish drama films
2020s Spanish films
2020s Spanish-language films
Films shot in the province of Segovia
Films shot in the Community of Madrid
2022 directorial debut films